Marquion is a commune in the Pas-de-Calais department in the Hauts-de-France region of France.

Geography
Junction 8 of the A26 autoroute is just a mile away.

Population

Places of interest
 The church of St. Aignan dating from the sixteenth century.

See also
Communes of the Pas-de-Calais department

References

External links

 The orchestra of the commune - Harmonie de Marquion 
 Marquion on the Quid website 

Communes of Pas-de-Calais